Starvation Draw, a valley in the Cookes Range, in Luna County, New Mexico.
Its mouth lies at an elevation of 4291 feet (1308m).

References 

Landforms of Luna County, New Mexico
Valleys of New Mexico